The Catholic People's Party (SKL) was a political party in Poland.

History
The party contested the January 1919 elections to elect the first Sejm of the Second Polish Republic. It received 1.8% of the vote, winning 18 seats. It contested the 1922 elections as part of the Polish Centre alliance.

References

Catholic political parties
Defunct political parties in Poland
Political parties established in 1918
Political parties disestablished in 1937
Agrarian parties in Poland